Qualifying for the 2019 Rugby World Cup for the Americas began in March 2016, where across 3 years, 20 teams competed for two direct qualification spots into the final tournament, and one spot in the Repechage tournament. For qualification purposes, the two Americas regions Rugby Americas North and Sudamérica Rugby formed the Americas region to compete for the two Americas berths in the World Cup.

One team in the Americas zone, Argentina, qualified automatically after reaching the semi-finals of the 2015 World Cup. The United States and Uruguay qualified as Americas 1 and Americas 2 respectively, while Canada moved to the Repechage tournament.

Format
The qualification process for the Americas region was a four-round process, the same process used for the 2015 Americas qualification.

Round 1 took place in 2016. Two pre-existing competitions, the Rugby Americas North Championship and the South American Rugby Championship Division B served as qualification tournaments, designated as Round 1A and Round 1B respectively. Round 1A was formed by the nine World Rugby members in RAN who were separated into two zones, a south and north zone. The bottom placed team from the 2015 tournament, Saint Vincent and the Grenadines had to play the returning team to the tournament, Jamaica, to earn the right to compete in the main tournament, with the winner of the qualifier match joining the south zone. The winners of each zone then competed in the Championship final, who thereby progressed to the Round 1 final. The other round 1 finalist was the winner of Round 1B, the 2016 South American Rugby Championship "B", where the winner of Round 1 advanced through to Round 2.

Round 2 also took place in 2016, with the 2016 South American Rugby Championship "A" forming Round 2A. The team placed bottom at the end of the Championship, played the winner of Round 1 in a promotion/relegation playoff to earn a place in the 2017 CONSUR Rugby Championship "A" competition and progress to Round 3.

Round 3 took place in 2017, with the top Sudamérica Rugby division, 2017 South American Rugby Championship "A", forming Round 3A. The winner of that round, advanced to Round 4. Round 3B was formed by a home-and-away play-off series between the top two non-automatic Americas qualifiers, Canada and the United States, where the winner of the play-off series qualified for the World Cup as Americas 1. The loser advanced to Round 4.

Round 4 took place in early 2018, matching the winner of Round 3A and the loser of 3B against each other in a home and away play-off. The winner of this round on aggregate, qualified as Americas 2. The loser moved to the Repechage tournament as Americas 3 for a second chance to qualify.

Entrants
Twenty teams competed during for the 2019 Rugby World Cup – Americas qualification; teams world rankings are prior to the first Americas qualification match on 5 March 2016 and bold nations denotes teams have previously played in a Rugby World Cup.

Round 1

Round 1A: 2016 Rugby Americas North Championship

The qualifying match between Jamaica and St Vincent and the Grenadines was the first qualifying match for the 2019 tournament, three-and-a-half years before the start of the tournament. Jamaica defeated St Vincent and the Grenadines 48–0, eliminating them from qualifying. The match was played in front of a record crowd of 1,000 at Arnos Vale Sports Complex, and was refereed by Nigel Owens who had refereed the 2015 Rugby World Cup Final. The victory boosted Jamaica to a World Rugby ranking of 72, their highest ever.

Qualifier

North Zone

South Zone

Championship final
Mexico, as winners, advance to the Round 1 final.

Round 1B: 2016 CONSUR Rugby Championship B

Qualifier

2016 CONSUR Rugby Championship B
The 2016 South American Rugby Championship "B" was held in October 2016 and hosted by Peru in Lima.

Round 1 Final
Colombia, as winners, advance to the round 2 final.

Round 2

Round 2A: 2016 CONSUR Rugby Championship "A"

Round 2 Final
Paraguay, as winners, advance to round 3A.

Round 3

Round 3A: 2017 CONSUR Rugby Championship "A"

Round 3B: United States v Canada Home & Away playoffs
The United States, as winners, qualify for the Rugby World Cup. Canada, as runners-up, qualify for the Americas repechage play-off.

Round 4: Americas Repechage play-off
Uruguay, as winners, qualify for the Rugby World Cup, their second time without an international play-off (first time in 2003 qualyfiers). Canada, as runners-up, qualify for the Repechage qualifying tournament.

See also
 2019 Rugby World Cup qualifying
 History of rugby union matches between Canada and the United States

References

External links
  "Regional qualification process set for Rugby World Cup 2019" (World Rugby)

2019
Americas
2016 in South American rugby union
2017 in South American rugby union
2018 in South American rugby union
2016 in North American rugby union
2017 in North American rugby union
2018 in North American rugby union